Edith Storey (March 18, 1892 – October 9, 1967) was an American actress during the silent film era.

Early life
Storey was born on March 18, 1892, in New York City to William Chase Storey and Minnie Storey (née Thorn). Her younger brother, Richard, also had a brief acting career.

Storey began acting when she was a child. Her film career began with the film Francesca di Rimini (1908), also called The Two Brothers. She would have two film roles in 1908, and a total of seventy-five by 1913. Many of these films were Westerns, as Storey was reportedly an excellent horseback rider and could perform her own stunts. Nicknamed Billy at the Star Film Ranch in Texas, she earned the good will of the seasoned cowboys in the Méliès film company for her ability to "ride anything with hair on it".

Career

Storey worked for New York-based Vitagraph Studios for most of her career except from 1910 to 1911, when she was under contract with Star Film Company in San Antonio, Texas. She appeared in nearly 150 films between 1908 and 1921, including The Immortal Alamo (1911), A Florida Enchantment (1914), and The Christian (1914), the latter film based on the Hall Caine novel of the same name, first made in 1911 and later remade in 1915 and 1923. In 1918, Storey signed with Metro; The Eyes of Mystery (1918) was her debut film for that studio.

She was noted for taking on male impersonation roles, such as Lillian/Lawrence in A Florida Enchantment (1924), and was compared to Vesta Tilley. She also referred to herself as 'Billy'.

Later life
 

She would appear in another seventy-one films from 1913 to 1921, almost all of which were what are considered film shorts. In 1921, aged 29, she retired. She has a star on the Hollywood Walk of Fame for her work in the film industry at 1523 Vine Street. She was residing in Northport, Long Island, New York at the time of her death on October 9, 1967, aged 75. She was cremated at Fresh Pond Crematory D.B.A. U.S. Columbarium co. on October 13, 1967.

Selected filmography

 Oliver Twist (1909)
 The Life of Moses (1909)
 The Immortal Alamo (1911)
 A Tale of Two Cities (1911)
 The Military Air-Scout (1911)
 An Aeroplane Elopement (1911)
 Billy and His Pal (AKA: Bobby and His Pal) (1911)
 Billy the Kid (1911)
 The Child Crusoes (1911)
 Never Again (1912)
 Red and White Roses (1913)
 Hearts of the First Empire (1913)
The Forgotten Latchkey (1913)
The Christian (1914)
 A Florida Enchantment (1914)
 Captain Alvarez (1914)
 The Tarantula (1916)
 The Two Edged Sword (1916)
 Money Magic (1917)
 Aladdin from Broadway (1917)
 Captain of the Gray Horse Troop (1917)
 Revenge (1918)
 The Eyes of Mystery (1918)
 The Legion of Death (1918)
 The Claim (1918)
 Treasure of the Sea (1918)
 The Demon (1918)
 The Silent Woman (1918)
 As the Sun Went Down (1919)
 Moon Madness (1920)
 Beach of Dreams (1921)
 The Greater Profit (1921)

References

External links

 
 Edith Storey at allmovie
 Early portrait (moviecard)
 Edith Storey and her Winton Six motorcar
  Billy and His Pal aka Bobby and His Pal at FilmPreservation.org's website

1892 births
1967 deaths
American silent film actresses
Actresses from New York City
People from Northport, New York
20th-century American actresses
Articles containing video clips